Stagonospora is a genus of fungi clustering in the Phaeosphaeriaceae (Quaedvlieg). Several of the species in this genus are plant pathogens.

Taxonomy 

Previously included species include S. curtisii= Peyronellaea curtisii (leaf scorch).

Bibliography 
 
 
 Zhang Y, Schoch CL, Fournier J, Crous PW, Gruyter J De, Woudenberg JHC, Hirayama K, Tanaka K, Pointing SB, Hyde KD. 2009. Multi-locus phylogeny of the Pleosporales: a taxonomic, ecological and evolutionary re-evaluation. Studies in Mycology 64: 85–102. 

Pleosporales
Dothideomycetes genera